Harita Kata {హరిత కత Telugu} (Green Short Story) is a short story writing competition in Telugu literature started by Jagruthi Kiran Foundation in association with Kadhakelli- Monthly magazine in the year 2009. Jagruthi Kiran Foundation is a prominent organisation promoting Environmental Awareness, that to through creative forms of literature in Telugu.  This is one of the activity of  Paryavarana Kavitodyamam (Environment Poetry Movement) started in the year 2008., prominent Environmentalist, Poet started this movement to create awareness on Environment among people.

More than 500 writers have participated in this competition.  Three winners have been decided for presentation of prizes.  Some of the stories are selected for publication apart from prize winning stories. These stories are getting published in Kadhakeli magazine now.  Many writers feel that winning prizes in this competition is prestigious.  They have strong feeling that taking part in this competition means marching for Environment protection and contributing for Environmental conservation.  This leads to SAVE EARTH.

Telugu Short Story Centenary (2009-2010)

Telugu short story is celebrating its centenary 2009-2010.  In this year many writers, scholars are researching on Telugu short story and its 100 years history.  With this Harita Kata (Green Short Story) Telugu short story is moving in new direction and dimension with all its earlier arguments of Dalit (suppressed people), Feminism, Revolution, stories on downtrodden etc.

Paryavaran Kavitodyamam is a new trend in Telugu literature with Harita Kavita (Green Poem), Harita Kata (Green Short Story).

Seminar on Harita Kata

A seminar was organised on Harita Kata at Rajahmundry on 24 January 2010 as part of Telugu Short Short Centenary Celebrations.  "Vidyavachaspati" Prof Dr N N Murthy spoke on importance of Harita Kata in modern Telugu literature.  Writer Vihari chaired the session.  This was organised by Vedagiri Communications.

Academic Research
One scholar is doing research at Yashwantrao Chavan Maharashtra Open University, Nashik (India) on Paryavaran Kavitodyamam, Harita Kavita and Harita Kata for her master's degree.

References

External links
 Jalleda.com
 N N Murthy speaks on Paryavaran Kavitodyamam-Citi Cable News, Vijayawada
 A Souvenir Dedicated to Nature and Environment
 హరిత-కవిత-2009
 N N Murthy speaks on Paryavaran Kavitodyamam at MHRD National Seminar, Delhi 
 Harita Kata (Paryavaran Kavitodyamam) at Rajahmundry 
 Candle Light March for Paryavaran Kavitodyamam
 Paryavaran Kavitodyamam at Hyderabad
 N N Murthy speaks on Paryavaran Kavitodyamam at Gemini TV Interview (Part-7)

Indian literature
Telugu language
Telugu-language literature
Telugu poetry